Piranha is a 2006 Russian action film directed by Andrey Kavun.

Plot
Under the guise of a joint holiday, police agent Kirill Mazur and his colleague Olga are sent to the Siberian taiga to liquidate a chemical weapons laboratory flooded at the bottom of the lake in a territory that will soon be abandoned to neighboring China.

Cast 
 Vladimir Mashkov as Mazur
 Svetlana Antonova as Olga
 Yevgeny Mironov as Prokhor
 Viktoriya Isakova as Sinilga
 Sergei Garmash as Zima
 Andrey Merzlikin as Shtabs
 Mikhail Yefremov as Dorokhov
 Alexey Gorbunov as Kuzmich
  as Viktoriya
  as doctor
 Anna Ukolova as Nina

Awards
 MTV Russia Movie Awards — best movie villain (Yevgeny Mironov)

References

External links 

2006 action thriller films
2006 films
Films based on Russian novels
Films set in Siberia
Russian action thriller films
2000s chase films
Films directed by Andrey Kavun
Underwater action films
Films shot in Russia
Films about terrorism in Europe
Russian films about revenge
2000s survival films